Brigt Rykkje (born 16 June 1975) is a Dutch and Norwegian speed skater. He was born in Bergen to a Dutch mother and Norwegian father, and grew up in the Netherlands. He is the brother of Bjarne Rykkje. He competed for Norway at the 1998 Winter Olympics in Nagano. He has competed for both Norway and the Netherlands at the world championships.

References

1975 births
Living people
Sportspeople from Bergen
Dutch male speed skaters
Norwegian male speed skaters
Olympic speed skaters of Norway
Speed skaters at the 1998 Winter Olympics
World Single Distances Speed Skating Championships medalists